Hepp is a surname. Notable people with the surname include:

Alexandre Hepp (1857–1924), French novelist, journalist and drama critic
Anna Hepp (born 1977), German filmmaker
David Hepp, American journalist
Ferenc Hepp (1909–1980), Hungarian basketball administrator
Johann Adam Philipp Hepp (1797–1867), German physician and lichenologist
Klaus Hepp (born 1936), German-born Swiss physicist
Leo Hepp (1907–1987), German general

See also  
Hep-Hep riots
HEP (disambiguation)
Hebb

de:Hepp